Gopal Saboo  was an Indian politician. He was elected to the Lok Sabha, the lower house of the Parliament of India, from Sikar in Rajasthan, as a member of the Bharatiya Jana Sangh.

References

External links
 Official biographical sketch in Parliament of India website

India MPs 1967–1970
Lok Sabha members from Rajasthan
Bharatiya Jana Sangh politicians
1926 births
Possibly living people